Robert Oberst (born December 20, 1984) is a retired former American professional strongman competitor. He is a yearly competitor of the World's Strongest Man competition and a finalist in the 2013 and 2018 World's Strongest Man competitions ending up in 9th and 8th place respectively. He also came 8th in the 2014 Arnold Strongman Classic the heaviest and the toughest strongman competition in the world. Oberst has competed in 15 international competitions.

Early life
Oberst was born in Santa Cruz, California. From a young age, he was considerably taller than most of his family and friends, standing at 6 ft 1 (1.85m) and weighing 220 lbs (99.8 kg) on his 12th birthday. Oberst parents divorced when he was in high school. He was picked on as a result and thought about dropping out because of it. He attended Aptos High School in Aptos, California. It was there he played football and track and field, lettering four times in football and once in track and field. He then went on to continue playing football at the collegiate level at Western Oregon University majoring in history. Oberst graduated from Western Oregon University in 2008.

After college, Oberst gave the NFL a shot, but did not make the cut so got into bouncing at nightclubs Esta Noche and El Rio. It was there that one of Oberst's friends introduced him to the world of Strongman competitions and encouraged him to train for the events. Upon going to his first workout session, he unofficially broke the amateur Log Press world record, which at the time was around 150 kg, or 330 lbs. With some training, his strength grew greater, and after only four months of training, Oberst had received his Pro-Card.

Oberst is known for advocating "People Shouldn’t Deadlift" at Joe Rogan’s podcast and recommends doing exercises such as cable lateral raises, dumbbell front raises and face pulls.

Strongman accomplishments
 First Place, San Jose Fit Expo, 2012
 First Place, Dallas Europa, 2012
 Third Place, America's Strongest Man, 2012
 First Place, Giants Live Las Vegas, 2013
 First Place, Odd Haugen's US Open MAS Wrestling Championship, 2013
 Third Place, All-American Strongman Challenge, 2013
 Sixth Place, Giants Live British Open, 2013
 Third Place, China's Strongest Man, 2013
 Ninth Place, World's Strongest Man, 2013
 Second Place, America's Strongest Man, 2013
 Fifth Place, MAS-Wrestling World Cup, 2013
 Eighth Place, Arnold Strongman Classic, 2014
 Second Place, America's Strongest Man, 2014
 Third Place, Arnold Strongman Classic Australia, 2015
 Sixth Place, Giants Live North American Open, 2016
 Sixth Place, Giants Live World Tour Finals, 2017
 Eighth Place, World's Strongest Man, 2018

Personal records
In competition
 Log Lift – 465 lb (211 kg)
 Deadlift -  - Done at 2015 Arnold Australia.

Retirement
On December 2, 2022, Oberst announced on the SHAWSTRENGTH Podcast that he is officially retired from the sport of professional strongman competitions going forward.

See also
 List of strongmen

References

1984 births
Living people
American strength athletes
Sportspeople from Santa Cruz, California